The Euphorinae are a large subfamily of Braconidae parasitoid wasps. Some species have been used for biological pest control. They are sister group to the Meteorinae.

Description and distribution 
Euphorines are small, usually dark colored wasps. They are non-cyclostomes. Euphorines are found worldwide.

Biology 
Euphorines are solitary or rarely gregarious koinobiont endoparasitoids. Unlike most other parasitoid wasps, Euphorinae have a broad host range and attack adult insects or nymphs of hemimetabolous insects.

Wasps of the tribe Dinocampini parasitize adult beetles. Its four genera are Dinocampus Foerster, Ropalophorous Curtis, Centistina Enderlein, and Betelgeuse.

Tribes 
Representative tribes of Euphorinae are Centistini, Cosmophorini, Cryptoxilonini, Dinocampini, Euphorini, Helorimorphini, Meteorini, Myiocephalini, Oncometeorini, Perilitini, Proclithrophorini, Syntretini, and Tainitermini.

Genera
These 36 genera belong to the subfamily Euphorinae:

 Allurus Förster, 1862 c g
 Aridelus Marshall, 1887 c g b
 Bracteodes De Saeger, 1946 c g
 Centistes Haliday, 1835 c g
 Centistina Enderlein, 1912 c g
 Chrysopophthorus Goidanich, 1948 c g b
 Cosmophorus Ratzeburg, 1848 c g
 Cryptoxilos Viereck, 1911 c g b
 Dinocampus Förster, 1862 c g b
 Eadya Huddleston & Short, 1978 c g
 Ecclitura Kokujev, 1902 c g
 Elasmosoma Ruthe, 1858 c g b
 Euphoriella Ashmead, 1900 g b
 Euphorus Nees, 1834 g
 Kollasmosoma van Achterberg & Argaman, 1993 c g
 Leiophron Nees von Esenbeck, 1818 c g b
 Marshiella Shaw, 1985 c g
 Meteorus Haliday, 1835 c g b
 Microctonus Wesmael, 1835 c g b
 Myiocephalus Marshall, 1897 c g
 Neoneurus Haliday, 1838 c g b
 Perilitus Nees von Esenbeck, 1818 c g
 Peristenus Foerster, 1862 g b
 Proclithrophorus Tobias & Belokobylskij, 1981 c g
 Pygostolus Haliday c g b
 Rilipertus Haeselbarth, 1996 c g
 Ropalophorus Curtis, 1837 c g
 Spathicopis van Achterberg, 1977 c g
 Stenothremma Shaw, 1984 c g
 Streblocera Westwood, 1833 c g
 Syntretellus De Saeger, 1946 c g
 Syntretoriana Parrott, 1953 c g
 Syntretus Förster, 1862 c g b
 Townesilitus Haeselbarth & Loan, 1983 g b
 Wesmaelia Förster, 1862 c g
 Zele Curtis, 1832 c g
Data sources: i = ITIS, c = Catalogue of Life, g = GBIF, b = Bugguide.net

References

External links 
 Photos on BugGuide
 DNA barcodes at BOLD systems

 
Apocrita subfamilies